Morgan is an unincorporated community in Phillips County, Montana, United States.

Description

In the footnotes of The Big Roads (2011) by Earl Swift, the author says that Morgan is the U.S. settlement farthest away (191.4 miles) from an Interstate highway.

See also

References

External links

Unincorporated communities in Phillips County, Montana
Unincorporated communities in Montana